Michael Brodsky (born 1972) is an Israeli diplomat. He was nominated as the next Israeli Ambassador to Ukraine on November 26, 2020. From 2015 to 2018 Brodsky served as the Israeli ambassador to The Republic of Kazakhstan.  He was succeeded by Ms Liat Wexelman in September, 2018.

Personal life
Michael Brodsky was born on August 19, 1972, in Saint Petersburg, Russia. In 1990,he made Aliyah to Israel together with his family. Michael Brodsky received a bachelor's degree in political science, and a master's degree in diplomacy and national security from Tel Aviv University. Michael Brodsky is married to Regina Shafir and has three children.

On March 4, 2022, Brodsky was injured in a car accident in Poland where he and his staff where leading efforts to assist Israelis to leave Ukraine. After being flown back to Israel, he was temporarily replaced by Simona Halperin, the Head of the Euro-Asia Bureau at the Foreign Ministry.

Career
Brodsky joined the Israeli Ministry of Foreign Affairs in 2002. He served as press attaché at the Israeli Embassy in Moscow (2003-2008), political attaché at the Israeli Embassy in Moscow (2006-2008) and director of public affairs at the Israeli Embassy in London (2009-2013). From 2015 to 2018 he served as the Israeli Ambassador to Kazakhstan. In 2016 he coordinated the visit of Israeli Prime Minister Benjamin Netanyahu to Kazakhstan, the first such visit ever. In media interviews, Brodsky urged that the relations between the two countries would reach the level of strategic partnership.

In 2015 he was nominated by the news website 'newsru.co.il' for 'Hero of the Year' award, for being the first civil servant to reach the rank of ambassador from the 1990s Post-Soviet aliyah.

He speaks Russian, Hebrew, English and German.

In 2021, following the annual march in Kyiv in honor of Stepan Bandera's birthday, the leader of the Ukrainian nationalists, Brodsky stated that Bandera was a Nazi collaborator. The day after, the adviser to the commander-in-chief of the Armed Forces of Ukraine Dmytro Yarosh, former leader of Right Sector, stated that "The Israeli ambassador is an agent of influence for the Kremlin. And it is necessary to drive such ”diplomats“ from Ukraine".

Publications

During the COVID-19 pandemic, Brodsky published several articles on the effect the pandemic might have on international diplomacy, and on the topic of medical diplomacy.

References

External link

1972 births
Tel Aviv University alumni
Soviet emigrants to Israel
Living people
Ambassadors of Israel to Ukraine
Ambassadors of Israel to Kazakhstan
Israeli people of Russian descent
Ambassadors of Israel to Kyrgyzstan